Peter Lenk (born 6 June 1947, in Nuremberg) is a German sculptor based in Bodman-Ludwigshafen on Lake Constance, known for the controversial sexual content of his public art.

Art

Lenk's artworks include:
Imperia, a ten-meter-tall rotating statue in the harbor of Konstanz, (Germany), depicting a fictional courtesan from a short story by Balzac. Although it was highly controversial when installed in 1993, today it is "the most photographed attraction in the city". A detail from the sculpture, a nude figure of Pope Martin V, was displayed in the Konstanz train station in 2010, but was removed after complaints from the Catholic church and CDU politicians.
Ludwigs Erbe, a relief sculpture in the town square of Bodman-Ludwigshafen that shows various German politicians engaged in sexual play.
A sculpture on the exterior of the office building in Berlin that houses die Tageszeitung, depicting the editor of a competing newspaper sporting an enormous penis.
A sculpture of Volker Kauder wearing only a skirt made of bananas, like one worn by Josephine Baker, for a benefit auction.
A statue of German writer Martin Walser wearing ice skates while he rides a horse that stands on the tails of two giant reclining mermaids in a fountain, at the boat landing in Überlingen.
Hölderlin im Kreisverkehr, a monument to German poet Friedrich Hölderlin installed in 2003 in a traffic roundabout in Lauffen am Neckar.

Books
Lenk is the author or co-author of:
Skulpturen: Bilder, Briefe, Kommentare (Konstanz: Stadler Verlagsges. Mbh, 2005).
Magische Säule Meersburg: Skulpturen (with Helmut Weidhase, Konstanz: Stadler Verlagsges. Mbh, 2007).

References

External links

 

Living people
German sculptors
German male sculptors
Artists from Bavaria
1947 births
People from Konstanz (district)